The Tickhole Tunnel, also called the Kotara (Tickhole) Railway Tunnel, is a heritage-listed double track railway tunnel 
that carries the Main Northern railway line beneath the Newcastle Inner City Bypass (A37) and is a diversion over the Tickhole Creek. The tunnel is located between Cardiff and Kotara stations in the City of Newcastle local government area of New South Wales, Australia.

The original  tunnel opened on 15 August 1887. It initially only had one track, but provision was made for the line to be duplicated which duly occurred in 1891. This second tunnel is used by southbound services, while the original tunnel once again became single track for northbound services.

See also

List of tunnels in Australia

References

Railway tunnels in New South Wales
Tunnels completed in 1887
Tunnels completed in 1983
Main North railway line, New South Wales
City of Newcastle
New South Wales Heritage Database